Peter Hoyt Dominick (July 7, 1915 – March 18, 1981) was an American diplomat, politician and lawyer from Colorado. A member of the Republican Party, he served in the United States Senate from 1963 to 1975. His uncle, Howard Alexander Smith, was a U.S. Senator from New Jersey from 1944 to 1959.

Life and career
Born in Stamford, Connecticut on July 7, 1915, Dominick graduated from St. Mark's School in 1933, from Yale University in 1937 as a member of Scroll and Key, and Yale Law School in 1940. He practiced law in New York City with the law firm Carter, Ledyard and Milburn from 1940 until 1942. Dominick then joined the United States Army Air Corps as an aviation cadet at the outset of American fighting in World War II. He served until his separation from military service in 1945, as a captain. He briefly recommenced his legal practice in New York City in 1946, before moving that same year to Denver, Colorado, where he continued to practice law, eventually becoming a founding partner of the law firm Holland & Hart.

Dominick entered politics when he was elected as a Republican to the Colorado House of Representatives, where he served from 1957 to 1961. In 1960, he made a successful run for the United States House of Representatives, defeating incumbent freshman Democrat Byron L. Johnson, and he abandoned his law career in 1961. After a single term in the House of Representatives, Dominick was elected to the United States Senate, defeating one-term incumbent Democrat John A. Carroll, 53.6% to 45.6%. He was reelected in 1968 over Stephen L. R. McNichols, a former Governor of Colorado, 58.6% to 41.5%. Dominick voted in favor of the Civil Rights Acts of 1964 and 1968, as well as the Voting Rights Act of 1965 and the confirmation of Thurgood Marshall to the U.S. Supreme Court. Dominick was also a supporter of major environmental litigation, supporting the enactment of the Wilderness Act in 1964, the National Environmental Policy Act in 1969, the Clean Air Act of 1970, the Clean Water Act of 1972, and the Endangered Species Act of 1973.

Senator Dominick served as chairman of the National Republican Senatorial Committee in the 92nd Congress from 1971 to 1973. In a good election year for Democrats, Dominick was defeated for a third term in 1974 by Gary Hart, 57.2% to 39.5%. By then Dominick was suffering from multiple sclerosis.  He also didn't help his case by saying, when asked a question about the value of U.N. Food Programs to certain countries, that Ugandans "would rather eat the people than the food", and by calling Watergate "insignificant."  After leaving the Senate at the end of his term in 1975, he was appointed Ambassador to Switzerland by President Gerald Ford, but served only briefly.  He resided in Cherry Hills Village, Colorado until his death at Hobe Sound, Florida, on March 18, 1981. Senator Dominick's body was interred in Fairmount Cemetery, Denver.

War Journal
Already a competent pilot, Peter Dominick solicited service with the US Air Corp. on Dec, 9th, 1941. Unbeknownst to even his family, Dominick had kept a meticulous journal of the entirety of his service during the war. Chronicling his flying over the Himalayas, or what pilots called "The Hump" or "The Aluminum Trail", the journal was discovered by his children and published by youngest Son, Alexander Dominick, in 2018.

References
 Retrieved on 2008-01-25

External links
 
Guide to the Peter H. Dominick Papers at the University of Denver Retrieved 2014-09-26.

|-

|-

|-

|-

|-

1915 births
1981 deaths
20th-century American politicians
Ambassadors of the United States to Switzerland
United States Army Air Forces pilots of World War II
Colorado lawyers
Republican Party members of the Colorado House of Representatives
New York (state) lawyers
People from Arapahoe County, Colorado
Politicians from New York City
Politicians from Stamford, Connecticut
Politicians from Denver
Republican Party members of the United States House of Representatives from Colorado
Republican Party United States senators from Colorado
St. Mark's School (Massachusetts) alumni
United States Army Air Forces officers
Yale Law School alumni
Lawyers from New York City
20th-century American lawyers
Military personnel from Colorado